Allina Health is a not-for-profit health care system based in Minneapolis, Minnesota, United States. It owns or operates 12 hospitals and more than 90 clinics throughout Minnesota and western Wisconsin. Its subsidiary, Allina Medical Transportation, covers eight regions and over 80 communities providing medical dispatch, 911 pre-arrival instructions, and emergency and non-emergency ambulance service.

History
In February 2012, Allina Hospitals and Clinics announced it was changing its name to Allina Health, to emphasize its new focus on disease prevention and personal vitality. 

Allina Health employed 29,382 employees in 2018. 

On February 9, 2021, a mass shooting and bombing occurred at an Allina Health clinic in Buffalo, Minnesota, leaving one person dead and four critically injured.

Hospitals
Abbott Northwestern Hospital, located in Minneapolis, Minnesota
Buffalo Hospital, located in Buffalo, Minnesota
Cambridge Medical Center, located in Cambridge, Minnesota
District One Hospital, Located in Faribault, Minnesota
Mercy Hospital - Mercy Campus, located in Coon Rapids, Minnesota
Mercy Hospital - Unity Campus, located in Fridley, Minnesota
New Ulm Medical Center, located in New Ulm, Minnesota
Owatonna Hospital, located in Owatonna, Minnesota
Phillips Eye Institute, located in Minneapolis, Minnesota
River Falls Area Hospital, located in River Falls, Wisconsin
St. Francis Regional Medical Center, located in Shakopee, Minnesota
United Hospital, located in St. Paul, Minnesota
United Hospital - Hastings Regina Campus, located in Hastings, Minnesota

Clinic systems
Allina Health Clinic
Aspen Medical Group and Quello Clinic are now Allina Health Clinics

Ambulatory sites
Abbott Northwestern Center for Outpatient Care Edina, Minnesota
Abbott Northwestern – Westhealth Plymouth, Minnesota
Elk Ridge – Elk River, Minnesota

Allina Home Oxygen and Medical Equipment
Allina Home Oxygen & Medical Equipment has provided oxygen, medical supplies and equipment for clients including children, adults and seniors with varying needs. (As of February 2022, Allina Health no longer owns or operates any DME operations)

Allina Home Care
Allina Home Care provides support, knowledge and assistance to help keep patients independent in the comfort of home.

Chronic and advanced illness
Provides services including Care Navigation Help Desk, Advance care planning, Palliative care, Hospice care, & SeniorCare Transitions

Integrative medicine
Founded in 2003, the Penny George Institute for Health and Healing is the largest health system based integrative medicine center in the United States.

Allina Emergency Medical Services (EMS) 
Allina EMS provides a variety of medical transportation services around the state of Minnesota.

See also
 List of hospitals in Minnesota
 Midtown Exchange
 Courage Kenny Rehabilitation Institute
 Penny George Institute for Health and Healing

References

External links
Official site of Allina Health
 Official site of the Penny George Institute for Health and Healing

Hospital networks in the United States
Healthcare in Minnesota
Healthcare in Wisconsin
Health care companies based in Minnesota
Health care companies established in 1983
American companies established in 1983
1983 establishments in Minnesota